Helen Park-Bates (born 3 June 1959) is a South Korean former professional tennis player.

Park attended college in the United States and had a successful career for Cal State LA in varsity tennis. She won the AIAW Division II singles championship in 1979 and is a member of Cal State LA's Athletics Hall of Fame.

A member of the South Korea Federation Cup team, Park featured in a total of seven ties for her country, winning one singles and two doubles rubbers. She debuted in 1976 and made her last appearance in 1984.

References

External links
 
 
 

1959 births
Living people
South Korean female tennis players
California State University, Los Angeles alumni